Eiko Matsumura  is a Japanese novelist. She is best known for her novel  which won the Akutagawa Prize in 1991.

Biography 
Matsumura was born in Shizuoka, Japan on July 3, 1961. She graduated from Tsukuba University. After graduation, she worked at a computer software company and began writing fiction. Her first work,  was published in 1990, and was well-received by critics.

Matsumura's next story,  won the Akutagawa Prize in 1991.

Selected works 

 , 1990
 , 1991

References 

1962 births
Living people
People from Shizuoka Prefecture
University of Tsukuba alumni
20th-century Japanese writers
Akutagawa Prize winners